George B. Reed (November 9, 1807January 10, 1883) was an American lawyer, Democratic politician, and Wisconsin pioneer.  He served six years in the Wisconsin State Senate, representing Manitowoc County.  He is the namesake of Reedsville, Wisconsin.

Background and early years 
Born in Middlesex County, Massachusetts, he studied at Middlebury College and studied law in Vermont. He moved to Milwaukee, Michigan Territory, in 1834, possibly from Chicago. He is believed to have been the first attorney to move to the Wisconsin Territory, and was for many years an advisor to Solomon Juneau.

His brother Curtis Reed would become Mayor of Menasha, Wisconsin, and their brother Harrison Reed, Governor of Florida. Their sister, Martha Reed Mitchell, well known in charity, art and society circles.

George Reed moved to Waukesha County, Wisconsin, to the town of Summit, where he farmed. While in Summit, he served in the first Wisconsin Constitutional Convention of 1846 and in the Wisconsin Territorial House of Representatives in 1847-1848. Eventually he moved to Manitowoc, Wisconsin, in 1850; while in Manitowoc, Reed served as a two-year term as county judge of Manitowoc County, Wisconsin, and was elected as the first village president of Manitowoc upon its incorporation as a village.

In 1854, Reed and Jacob Lueps bought a portion of the town of Maple Grove and had it surveyed and platted. These 56 blocks became the village of Mud Creek, later renamed Reedsville after "Judge Reed" (as he was widely known).

Reed served as a Democratic member of the Wisconsin State Senate from 1865 to 1870.

Reed was involved in the railroad business. He died in the Newhall House Hotel Fire in Milwaukee in 1883.

References 

|-

1807 births
1883 deaths
Businesspeople from Milwaukee
Farmers from Wisconsin
Mayors of places in Wisconsin
Middlebury College alumni
Members of the Wisconsin Territorial Legislature
19th-century American politicians
People from Middlesex County, Massachusetts
Politicians from Milwaukee
People from Reedsville, Wisconsin
People from Summit, Waukesha County, Wisconsin
American city founders
Wisconsin state court judges
Democratic Party Wisconsin state senators
Lawyers from Milwaukee
19th-century American judges
19th-century American lawyers
Deaths from fire in the United States